Karl Hjorth (15 July 1875 – 26 April 1949) was a Swedish male fencer. He competed at the 1906 and the 1912 Summer Olympics.

References

External links
 

1875 births
1949 deaths
Swedish male foil fencers
Olympic fencers of Sweden
Fencers at the 1906 Intercalated Games
Fencers at the 1912 Summer Olympics
Sportspeople from Stockholm
20th-century Swedish people